"Say You Will" is a song from British-American band Fleetwood Mac's 17th studio album, Say You Will (2003). The song reached number seven on the US Billboard Adult Alternative Songs chart and was performed live on Fleetwood Mac's Say You Will Tour. The song features vocals from American singer-songwriter Sheryl Crow, bass guitarist John McVie's daughter Molly McVie, singer Stevie Nicks' niece Jessica Nicks and Jessica's best friend Maddy Felsch.

Background
Nicks said the following in Performing Songwriter Magazine in 2003:

"...but that song is not just about Lindsey. It’s about a movie I saw about Arturo Sandoval, the trumpet player...that was really my inspiration for that song. The chorus was written first, then I went back to write the verses... you have this great chorus that basically says, "If you dance with me, you won’t be mad at me anymore. We can be in a huge argument, but if we put on some music and start to dance, everything will be great." Then I had to think about what to make the verses about. So I went back over all my relationships with people and think of different ways that I have felt when I wanted basically to burst into song and sing that chorus (laughs). Give me one more chance. That’s what came out of it. It’s funny because, we just did an interview the day before yesterday, and I don’t think any of the band knows that that was the reason I wrote the song."

Track listing
Reprise Records – PRO-CDR-101137
 "Say You Will" (Single Remix Fade) – 3:49
 "Say You Will" (Single Remix Cold) – 3:36

 Producer – Lindsey Buckingham
 Remix – Chris Lord-Alge

Personnel 
 Stevie Nicks – lead vocals
 Lindsey Buckingham – keyboards, guitars, backing vocals
 John McVie – bass guitar
 Mick Fleetwood – drums, percussion

Additional personnel
 Sheryl Crow – Hammond organ, backing vocals
 Molly McVie – backing vocals
 Jessica Nicks – backing vocals
 Maddy Felsch – backing vocals

Technical personnel 
 Producer – Lindsey Buckingham
 Engineers – Lindsey Buckingham, Ken Allardyce, Ken Koroshetz, Ray Lindsey, Mark Needham, Phil Nichols, Matthew J. Doughty 
 Recording – The Bellagio House, Ocean Way Recording, Hollywood, California
 Mixing – Mark Needham
 Mixing assistants – Phil Nichols, Matthew J Doughty, Joe Bozzi 
 Mastering – Bernie Grundman

Charts

Release history

References

Bibliography
The Great Rock Discography. Martin C.Strong. Page 378. 

Fleetwood Mac songs
2003 singles
2003 songs
Reprise Records singles
Song recordings produced by John Shanks
Song recordings produced by Rob Cavallo
Songs written by Stevie Nicks